The Cyberjaya Utara MRT station (Working name: Cyberjaya North) is a mass rapid transit (MRT) station. It is one of two train stations that will serve the town of Cyberjaya, the other being Pusat Bandar Cyberjaya. It is one of the stations being built as part of the Klang Valley Mass Rapid Transit (KVMRT) project on the Sungai Buloh-Serdang-Putrajaya Line.

Location 
Like the other station in Cyberjaya, it is located at the outskirts of the town, in that case this station is located near the SkyPark residence. Feeder buses, e-hailing or taxi are required to access the certain areas within Cyberjaya.

Bus Services

Feeder buses

References

External links
 Cyberjaya North MRT Station | mrt.com.my
 Klang Valley Mass Rapid Transit
 MRT Hawk-Eye View

Rapid transit stations in Selangor
Sungai Buloh-Serdang-Putrajaya Line